Nusrathul Islam Madrasa is a madrasa (Islamic religious school) in Pullancheri, Manjeri, Kerala, India. The school provides both Islamic religious education and secular coursework for primary and secondary students in grades 1 - 10.

Nusrathul Madrasa is affiliated with the All Kerala Islamic Religious Education Board.

Madrasas in India
Manjeri
Schools in Malappuram district